Caluco is a city and municipality in the Sonsonate department of El Salvador. According to the 2007 Population and Housing Census, it has a population of 9,139.

History 

Caluco was a producer of cocoa.

Area 

The municipality is 51.43 km² (19.86 mi²) large.

References 

Municipalities of the Sonsonate Department